Montrabé is a railway station in Montrabé, Occitanie, France. It is situated on the Brive–Toulouse (via Capdenac) railway line. The station is served by TER (local) services operated by SNCF.

Train services
The following services currently call at Montrabé:
local service (TER Occitanie) Toulouse–Albi–Rodez
local service (TER Occitanie) Toulouse–Castres–Mazamet

References

Railway stations in France opened in 1864
Railway stations in Haute-Garonne